Nathaniel Joseph Selver Francis (6 May 1912 – 2 November 2004) was a Turks and Caicos Islander politician who served as the 4th Chief Minister of the Turks and Caicos Islands from 28 March 1985 until 25 July 1986, when he was forced to resign after charges of corruption and patronage were leveled against him.

Prior to becoming Chief Minister, Francis was deputy minister of public works.

Francis died in 2004 and the new Parliament Buildings of the Turks and Caicos was renamed NJS Francis Building in 2005.

References

1912 births
2004 deaths
Chief Ministers of the Turks and Caicos Islands
Heads of government who were later imprisoned
Progressive National Party (Turks and Caicos Islands) politicians